The Yemen Arab Republic (YAR), also known simply as North Yemen or Yemen (Sanaʽa), was a country from 1962 to 1990 in the northwestern part of what is now Yemen. Its capital was at Sanaa. It united with the People's Democratic Republic of Yemen (commonly known as South Yemen) on 22 May 1990 to form the current Republic of Yemen.

History 

Following the dissolution of the Ottoman Empire in 1918 after the Great War, northern Yemen became an independent state as the Mutawakkilite Kingdom of Yemen. On 27 September 1962, revolutionaries inspired by the Arab nationalist ideology of United Arab Republic (Egyptian) President Gamal Abdel Nasser deposed the newly crowned King Muhammad al-Badr, took control of Sanaʽa, and established the Yemen Arab Republic (YAR). This coup d'état marked the beginning of the North Yemen Civil War that pitted YAR troops, assisted by the United Arab Republic (Egypt), against Badr's royalist forces, supported by Saudi Arabia and Jordan. Conflict continued periodically until 1967, when Egyptian troops were withdrawn to join the conflict of the Six-Day War. By 1968, following a final royalist siege of Sanaa, most of the opposing leaders reached a reconciliation. Saudi Arabia recognized the Republic in 1970.

Unlike East and West Germany or North and South Korea, the YAR and its southeastern neighbor, the People's Democratic Republic of Yemen (PDRY), also known as South Yemen, remained relatively cordial, though relations were often strained. Following the Yemenite War of 1972, the two nations declared that unification would eventually occur. However, these plans were put on hold due to the Yemenite War of 1979, and war was stopped only by an Arab League intervention. The goal of unity was reaffirmed by the northern and southern heads of state during a summit meeting in Kuwait in March 1979.

Unification 

In May 1988, the YAR and PDRY governments came to an understanding that considerably reduced tensions. They agreed to renew discussions concerning unification, to establish a joint oil exploration area along their undefined border, to demilitarize the border, and to allow Yemenis unrestricted border passage on the basis of a national identification card.

Official Yemeni unification took place on 22 May 1990, with a planned, 30-month process, scheduled for completion in November 1992. The first stamp bearing the inscription "Yemen Republic" was issued in October 1990. While government ministries proceeded to merge, both currencies remained valid until 11 June 1996. A civil war in 1994 delayed the completion of the final merger.

See also 
 History of Yemen
 Mutawakkilite Kingdom of Yemen
 North Yemen national football team
 President of North Yemen
 Prime Minister of North Yemen
 United Nations Security Council Resolution 188
 Yemen

References

 
States and territories established in 1962
States and territories disestablished in 1990
Former countries in the Middle East
Arab republics
Former Arab states
Former republics
Military dictatorships
Former member states of the United Nations